The 1992 United States Senate election in Wisconsin was held on November 3, 1992. Incumbent Republican U.S. Senator Bob Kasten ran for re-election to a third term but was defeated by Democrat Russ Feingold.

Republican primary

Candidates
 Roger W. Faulkner
 Bob Kasten, incumbent U.S. Senator

Results

Democratic primary

Candidates
 Joseph Checota, businessman
 Russ Feingold, State Senator
 Edmond C. Hou-Seye, perennial candidate
 Thomas Keller
 Jim Moody, U.S. Representative

Campaign
Feingold, who had little name recognition in the state and was campaigning in a primary against a pair of millionaire opponents, U.S. Congressman Jim Moody and Milwaukee businessman Joe Checota, adopted several proposals to gain the electorate's attention. The most memorable of these was a series of five promises written on Feingold's garage door in the form of a contract. Also noted was Feingold's advertising campaign, which was widely compared to that used by progressive candidate Paul Wellstone in his victorious Senate campaign in Minnesota. Shot in the form of home movies, the ads attempted to portray Feingold, who always referred to himself as "the underdog running for U.S. senate," as a down-to-earth, Capra-esque figure, taking the audience on a guided tour of the candidate's home and introducing them to his children, all of whom were enrolled in public school.

The ads also contained a significant amount of humor. One featured Feingold meeting with an Elvis Presley impersonator, who offered Feingold his endorsement. (Bob Kasten responded to the Elvis endorsement with an advertisement featuring an Elvis impersonator attacking Feingold's record.) Another showed Feingold standing next to a pair of half-sized cardboard cut-outs of his opponents, refusing to "stoop to their level" as the two were shown literally slinging mud at one another.

During the primary campaign, Feingold unveiled an 82-point plan that aimed to eliminate the deficit by the end of his first term. The plan, which called for, among other things, a raise in taxes and cuts in the defense budget, was derided as "extremist" by Republicans and "too liberal" by his Democratic opponents. Feingold also announced his support for strict campaign finance reform and a national health care system and voiced his opposition to term limits and new tax cuts.

Feingold won by positioning himself as a quirky underdog who offered voters an alternative to what was seen by many as negative campaigning of opponents Jim Moody and Joe Checota. On primary day, Feingold, whose support had shown in the single digits throughout much of the campaign, surged to victory with 70 percent of the vote.

Results

General election

Results
While Bill Clinton, George H. W. Bush, and Ross Perot split the Wisconsin presidential vote 41%-37%-21%, Feingold beat Kasten by a margin of 53 percent to 46 percent.

See also
 1992 United States Senate elections

References

1992 Wisconsin elections
Wisconsin
1992